During the 2009–10 English football season, Brighton & Hove Albion F.C. competed in Football League One.

Season summary
After a run of three wins from the opening fifteen games, Albion found themselves in 20th place and above the relegation zone only on goal difference. As a result, boss Russell Slade was sacked on 1 November 2008, to be replaced by former Chelsea midfielder Gus Poyet, after Steve Coppell had rejected the chance to manage the club for a second time. Poyet guided Brighton away from the relegation zone, finishing the season in 13th place.

Brighton reached the fourth round of the FA Cup, being beaten by eventual semi-finalists Aston Villa. In the League Cup, Brighton were eliminated in the first round by Championship side Swansea City. The Seagulls were also knocked out of the Football League Trophy at the same stage they entered; in the Southern area second round they were defeated by Leyton Orient.

Competitions

League One

Results

Football League Cup

As with all League One sides, Brighton & Hove Albion entered the Football League Cup in the First Round.

Football League Trophy

Brighton & Hove Albion received a bye to the Second Round, where they competed in the Southern section.

FA Cup

As Brighton were playing in League One, they entered the FA Cup in the First Round Proper.

Players

First-team squad
Squad at end of season

Left club during season

Kit
Brighton's kit was manufactured by Italian supplier Erreà and sponsored by It First.

References

Notes

Brighton & Hove Albion F.C. seasons
Brighton and Hove Albion F.C.